Elizabeth Raum (born 13 January 1945) is a Canadian oboist and composer.

Biography
Elizabeth Raum was born in Berlin, New Hampshire in 1945, but became a Canadian citizen in 1985. She studied oboe performance with Robert Sprenkle at the Eastman School of Music, graduating in 1966.
In 1985, received a master's degree in composition from the University of Regina after studies with Thomas Schudel. She played principal oboe for the Atlantic Symphony Orchestra in Halifax, Nova Scotia, for seven years, and later for the Regina Symphony Orchestra in Regina, Saskatchewan. In 2004, she received an honorary doctorate from Mount St. Vincent University, Halifax, Nova Scotia. 
 In November 2010, she received the Saskatchewan Order of Merit for her work as a musician and composer.

Works
Elizabeth Raum's works have been performed internationally and broadcast on national media. She is a prolific composer and has produced opera, chamber pieces, choral works, vocal works and ballets. She has also written extensively for film and video. Works for selected films include:

Saskatchewan River
Like Mother, Like Daughter
Sparkle
Evolution: A Theme with Variations
Prelude to Parting
The Green Man Ballet
Symphony of Youth

Selected recordings include:

Prairie Alphabet Musical Parade
A Prairie Alphabet
The Legend of Heimdall
Renovated Rhymes
Incantations and Rhymes
Sonata for Piano Four Hands
Requiem for Wounded Knee
Pantheon for violin, horn, and piano
how bodies leave ecstatic marks

References

External links
 
 Elizabeth Raum at The Encyclopedia of Saskatchewan
 New Grove's Dictionary of Music and Musicians, 2001

1945 births
Living people
20th-century classical composers
20th-century American women musicians
20th-century American composers
20th-century Canadian composers
20th-century women composers
American classical composers
American women classical composers
Canadian oboists
Canadian classical composers
Women film score composers
Musicians from New Hampshire
Women oboists
Eastman School of Music alumni
Members of the Saskatchewan Order of Merit
University of Regina alumni
People from Berlin, New Hampshire
20th-century Canadian women musicians
Canadian women composers
21st-century American women